HMS Cotillion has been the name of two Royal Navy vessels of the 20th century:

See also
 Cotillion, a French square dance

Royal Navy ship names